Dekadance is a Rock band from Dresden, Germany, founded in the early 1980s. Their music is influenced by many genres, for instance folk, jazz, rock and experimental - being described as is quite Zappaesque. They were seen as an alternative music band that shared more or less open criticism of the East German political system. The band is known for its surreal and bizarre form of humour that tends to underpin its live performance.

The band members are also involved in various independent projects, such as "The New Fantastic Art Orchestra Of North", "Aufruhr in der Savanne (a.i.d.s.)", the "Rockys", "Potentia Animi", and "Olaf Schubert".

Discography
 Happy Birthday (1989)
 Dem Deutschen Volke (1991)
 Peace Light (1992)
 Unfugged (1994)
 The Lappen (1997)
 Die Fette kommt (1999)
 Live in London (2002)

External links
  
 

East German musical groups